Mike Lang is an American politician serving as a Republican member of the Montana Senate, where he represents District 17, including Malta, Montana. He chairs the Senate Agriculture, Livestock and Irrigation Committee.

References

Living people
People from Phillips County, Montana
21st-century American politicians
Republican Party Montana state senators
1949 births